Larrea may refer to:

Larrea Cav. 1800, a genus of caltrops
Larrea Ortega 1797, nom. rejec., a synonym of Hoffmannseggia Cav. 1798
Larrea, Alava, a village in Álava, Spain